Carex colchica is a species of perennial plant in the family Cyperaceae.

Synonyms
 Carex arenaria var. castanea Boott
 Carex arenaria var. colchica (J.Gay) Christ
 Carex arenaria subsp. colchica (J.Gay) Nyman
 Carex arenaria subsp. ligerica (J.Gay) Bonnier & Layens
 Carex colchica subsp. ligerica (J.Gay) T.V.Egorova
 Carex ligerica J.Gay
 Carex ligerica f. capitata Lackow. & Paul
 Carex ligerina Boreau
 Carex schoenoides Schrank
 Carex schreberi subsp. ligerica (J.Gay) Almq.
 Vignea colchica (J.Gay) Soják
 Vignea ligerica (J.Gay) Soják

References
 J.Gay, Ann. Sci. Nat., Bot., II, 10: 303 (1838)
 Encyclopedia of Life entry
 eMonocot entry
 The Plant List entry

colchica
Flora of Europe
Flora of Asia
Plants described in 1838